The 1894 Brigg by-election was held on 7 December 1894.  The by-election was held due to the appointment of the incumbent Liberal MP, Samuel Danks Waddy as recorder of Sheffield.  It was won by the Conservative candidate John Maunsell Richardson.

Votes

References

1894 in England
Brigg
1894 elections in the United Kingdom
By-elections to the Parliament of the United Kingdom in Lincolnshire constituencies